KEYG (1490 AM, "Key Country 1490 AM") was a radio station broadcasting a modern country music format. Licensed to Grand Coulee, Washington, United States, the station was last owned by Wheeler Broadcasting and featured programming from Westwood One.

On June 29, 2020, Wheeler Broadcasting, Inc. and Resort Radio, LLC entered into a management and programming agreement, with Resort Radio, LLC to begin operating KEYG & KEYG-FM beginning on July 1, with KEYG launching a new country format to better serve the local communities.

Its license was cancelled on December 14, 2021.

References

External links
FCC Station Search Details: DKEYG (Facility ID: 72155)
FCC History Cards for KEYG (covering 1977-1981 as KNCW)

Radio stations established in 1979
Radio stations disestablished in 2021
EYG
Mass media in Grant County, Washington
Defunct radio stations in the United States
EYG